Jhigly is a village located in Bhatgaon Union of Chhatak Upazila in Sunamganj District within the division of Sylhet, Bangladesh.

Geography
Jhigly is located in the southern part of Chhatak Upazila.

Education
Notable educational institutions of Jhigly are as follows:
 Jamea Islamia aravia jhigly 
 Bade-Jhigly Primary School
 Sulaimanpur Primary School
 Jhigly High School
 Jhigly Hafizia Madrasa
 Jhigly College
 Jhigly khadijatul kubra mohila madrasah

See also
 List of villages in Bangladesh

References

Villages in Chhatak Upazila